The 1948 Salta earthquake took place in the Argentinian province of Salta on 25 August at  The shock was 7.0 on the moment magnitude scale and had a maximum Mercalli Intensity of IX (Violent). Property damage and casualties occurred in several towns in the east and southeast of Salta, and also in northern Tucumán and Jujuy, affecting the capitals of both. It was the last major earthquake recorded in the Argentine Northwest until the 2010 Salta earthquake.

See also
 List of earthquakes in 1948
 List of earthquakes in Argentina

References

External links
 Terremotos Históricos De La República Argentina – Instituto Nacional de Prevención Sísmica 
 

1948 in Argentina
1948
Geology of Salta Province
Salta, 1948
1948 disasters in Argentina